Mary Godolphin is the name of:

Mary Godolphin, Duchess of Leeds (died 1992)
Mary Godolphin (writer) (1781–1864), author